Óscar Adolfo Naranjo Trujillo (born 22 December 1956) is a Colombian politician and a former General of  the National Police of Colombia. He served as the Vice President of Colombia from 29 March 2017 until 7 August 2018 (under the mandate of President Juan Manuel Santos).

Career 
Naranjo was the Director General of the Police from 2007 until his retirement in 2012.  He also held the position of Director of Police Intelligence and was Police Commander of Bolivar.

After he retired from the police in 2012, Naranjo was appointed as a peace negotiator by President Santos in the Colombian peace negotiations with the FARC.

References

Colombian generals
Colombian police officers
Living people
1956 births
Colombian political people
Vice presidents of Colombia